The 1946/47 NTFL season was the 26th season of the Northern Territory Football League (NTFL).

Waratah have won their seventh premiership title while defeating the Buffaloes in the grand final by 29 points.

Grand Final

References 

Northern Territory Football League seasons
NTFL